WPHX can refer to:

 WWSF, a radio station (1220 AM) licensed to Sanford, Maine, United States, which held the call sign WPHX from 1999 to 2012
 WXEX-FM, a radio station (92.1 FM) licensed to Sanford, Maine, which held the call sign WPHX-FM from 1999 to 2011